The Terry Fox Run is an annual non-competitive charity event held around the world to raise money for cancer research
in commemoration of Canadian cancer activist Terry Fox and his Marathon of Hope.

The event was founded in 1981 by Isadore Sharp, who had contacted Terry in hospital by telegram and expressed his wishes to hold an annual run in Terry's name to raise funds for cancer research. Sharp had lost his son to cancer in 1979. The event is held every year on the second Sunday following Labour Day. Since its inception, it has raised via the 'Terry Fox Foundation' over $750 million (CAD). The run is informal which means that the distance often varies, usually between 5 and 15 kilometres; participation is considered to be more important than completing the set distance. There are also runs set up by schools of every level, often with shorter distances than the "official" ones.

The Terry Fox Run has no corporate sponsorship, in accordance with Terry Fox's original wishes of not seeking fame or fortune from his endeavour.  During his cross-Canada run, he rejected every endorsement he was offered (including from multinational corporations such as McDonald's), as he felt that it would detract from his goal of creating public awareness. The Terry Fox Runs have no advertisements on any race related materials (such as T-shirts, banners, etc.).

History

The Terry Fox Foundation was founded in 1988 after it separated from the Canadian Cancer Society. Since its inception, The Terry Fox Foundation has raised over $800 million for cancer research. Currently, Terry Fox Runs take place every year with many participants from all over the world. The Run is a volunteer led, all-inclusive, non-competitive event with no corporate sponsorship, incentives or fundraising minimums. Fox laid out these wishes before his death in 1981.

In 2007 The Terry Fox Foundation created the Terry Fox Research Institute to conduct transnational research to significantly improve outcomes for cancer patients. In the fiscal year ending March 31, 2013, The Terry Fox Foundation directed $27.7 million to its cancer research programs.

The Terry Fox Foundation has expanded beyond the traditional Run as well, by holding various other events. These events include National School Run Day, where schools throughout Canada hold a Run to commemorate Fox and raise funds, and The Great Canadian Hair "Do", which is a fundraising event that can take place at any time of the year. Participants are able to make the event as creative as they want— shave their heads, dye their hair a wacky colour, include a manly leg wax, and recruit friends to shave their heads as well.

Debuts by country
 Canada -September 13, 1981, at 760 sites
 Cuba - 1998. In 2005, over 1.9 million people used 3,600 sites. In 2006, it had around 2.6 million participants. The tenth run in 2007 had 4,652 sites and 2.267 million runners.
 United States - 1990 in Bangor, Maine
Venezuela - 1998 at the Colegio Internactional de Caracas

 Bulgaria - 2013 at the Anglo-American School of Sofia
 Croatia - 2000
 Hungary - 1999, ended in 2005
 Poland - 2006
 Portugal - 1994
Spain - 2017
 Oman - 2008
 Syria - 1991, ended after 2010 for civil war

 Australia - September 1988 in Brisbane (legacy from Expo '88) raising $22,000 (AUD)
 China - 1998
 Hong Kong - 2013
 Malaysia - Early 1990s in Kuala Lumpur
 Philippines - 2001 in Cebu City
 Taiwan - 2001 in Taipei City
 Thailand - 1995 in Bangkok
 Vietnam - 1996 in Ho Chi Minh City. In 2014, it drew about 16,500 participants and the organization committee included the Canadian Chamber of Commerce in Vietnam.

See also
 List of monuments and memorials to Terry Fox
 Pan-Mass Challenge, the largest charity athletic event in the USA to fund cancer research
 Relay for Life
 The Ride to Conquer Cancer

References

External links

 Official site
 Terry Fox Run in Cuba Photos

Terry Fox
Long-distance running competitions
Cancer fundraisers
Charities based in Canada
Charity events in Canada
Organizations established in 1981
Recurring sporting events established in 1981
1981 establishments in Canada